was the second of ten s built for the Imperial Japanese Navy in the mid-1930s under the Circle Two Supplementary Naval Expansion Program (Maru Ni Keikaku).

History
The Asashio-class destroyers were larger and more capable that the preceding , as Japanese naval architects were no longer constrained by the provisions of the London Naval Treaty. These light cruiser-sized vessels were designed to take advantage of Japan’s lead in torpedo technology, and to accompany the Japanese main striking force and in both day and night attacks against the United States Navy as it advanced across the Pacific Ocean, according to Japanese naval strategic projections. Despite being one of the most powerful classes of destroyers in the world at the time of their completion, none survived the Pacific War.

Ōshio, built at the Maizuru Naval Arsenal was laid down on 5 August 1936, launched on 19 April 1937 and commissioned on 31 October 1937.

Operational history
At the time of the attack on Pearl Harbor, Ōshio was assigned to Destroyer Division 8 (Desdiv 8), and a member of Destroyer Squadron 2 (Desron 2) of the IJN 2nd Fleet, escorting Admiral Nobutake Kondō's Southern Force Main Body out of Mako Guard District as distant cover to the Malaya and Philippines invasion forces in December 1941.

Ōshio escorted a Malaya troop convoy from Mako towards Singora, then put into Hong Kong on 5 January 1942. She escorted another troop convoy to Davao, and then accompanied the Ambon invasion force (31 January), the Makassar invasion force (8 February) and the Bali/Lombok invasion force (18 February).

On the night of 19 February 1942, Ōshio participated in the Battle of Badoeng Strait. Ōshio was guarding the transport Sasago Maru off Bali when an Allied fleet attacked. During the battle, Ōshio has been credited with assisting in sinking the Dutch destroyer  with a torpedo, plus gunnery hits on the Dutch light cruiser  and the American destroyer . Ōshio suffered medium damage, with seven crewmen killed.

In March, after emergency repairs at Makassar, Ōshio returned to Yokosuka Naval Arsenal for repairs, which lasted to the end of the year.

In early January 1943, Ōshio was sent from Maizuru to Shortland Island, and participated in three missions to evacuate surviving Japanese troops from Guadalcanal in early February. She was removed from the navy list on 1 April 1943.

Notes

References

External links
 CombinedFleet.com: Asashio-class destroyers
 CombinedFleet.com: Oshio history
GlobalSecurity.org: Asashio class destroyers

Asashio-class destroyers
Ships built by Maizuru Naval Arsenal
World War II destroyers of Japan
Ships sunk by American submarines
1937 ships
Maritime incidents in February 1943
World War II shipwrecks in the Pacific Ocean